Phillip Joseph Fearon (born 30 July 1956) is a Jamaican–English record producer. He was the lead singer, songwriter and multi-instrumentalist for the 1980s band Galaxy.

Career
Fearon was born in the Colony of Jamaica in 1956 and moved to London with his parents at the age of six in 1962.  After running a reggae sound system, he joined Hott Wax (which evolved into Brit funk pioneers Hi-Tension after he left). In the late 1970s was a mainstay of hit group Kandidate which scored a number 11 chart hit in 1979 with "I Don't Wanna Lose You". He set up a studio in his north London house and initially recorded with the group Proton on Champagne Records. 

Fearon first conceived Galaxy as a band of "four or five white guys" that he would manufacture and write and produce for, while he remained behind the scenes. Instead he was encouraged by a prospective record company to front the act after they were impressed by his performance on his demos.

Fearon's first recording as Galaxy (with assistance from singers Julie and Dorothy) was "Head Over Heels" on Ensign Records in 1982, which became a club hit. The first success came with the top 5 hit "Dancing Tight" in 1983  and over the next 15 months they chalked up a further four UK top 40 singles including the top 10s "What Do I Do" and "Everybody's Laughing".  Their post-disco debut album, Phil Fearon and Galaxy also made the top 10 in 1984. After a quiet period, Fearon returned to the top 10 for the last time with a revival of Tony Etoria's "I Can Prove It" in 1986 (also a minor US R&B hit). Originally self-produced, the track was given additional production and mixing by hitmakers Stock Aitken Waterman at the suggestion of Fearon's record company, with the singer totally re-recording his original vocal under the direction of producer Mike Stock. 

The artist's version of "Ain't Nothin' But a Houseparty" was also produced by Stock Aitken Waterman, but this time Fearon's contribution was reduced to coming in to the studio to sing on the track, which was entirely the producers' vision. "I was a bit like a passenger on that one, a willing passenger," he recalled.

'It was a little bit daunting because I wasn't sure if the sound was going to work for me."

After his diversion with SAW, Fearon continued to run a production company from his home making commercial dance records.

Similar to the RAH Band, Galaxy was not a true group of musicians but a front for an individual producing all the music in a studio environment, with two female backing singers to supplement the recording sound (Dorothy Galdes and Julie Gore). Galaxy's best known hits are "Dancing Tight", "What Do I Do?", "Everybody's Laughing" and "I Can Prove It", which were all up-beat commercial pop songs, hitting the top 10 of the UK Singles Chart.  They also had a near-top 40 hit with "You Don't Need a Reason" which stalled at number 42 on the UK chart in 1985. Galaxy's records were distinctly early 1980s in style, with prominent use of synthesizers.

Galaxy's popularity waned in the late 1980s, with the trend moving towards acid house, though the later single, a cover version of the Showstoppers' "Ain't Nothin' But a Houseparty" was an early example of this genre. In 1987, Fearon founded and managed a successful record label called Production House Records.

Fearon returned to performing as a special guest at the Caister Soul Weekender in May 2010, being brought out of retirement by longtime colleagues and Caister Soul Weekender promoters Chris Hill and Brian Rix.  Fearon has since continued to appear at 1980s soul nights and various festivals around the UK and abroad.

Personal life
Fearon is married to Dorothy "Dee" Galdes, the vocalist on the Baby D song "Let Me Be Your Fantasy". Their daughter Stephanie is an actress and singer, who appeared on the CITV show, My Parents Are Aliens, and was later a semi-finalist on the 2010 BBC talent search Over the Rainbow. The couple's son Marlon is also an aspiring actor.

Discography

Albums

Singles

Notes

References

External links
 Phil Fearon & Galaxy discography at Discogs.

English record producers
20th-century Black British male singers
English multi-instrumentalists
British contemporary R&B singers
Living people
1956 births
Post-disco musicians
Jamaican emigrants to the United Kingdom
Chrysalis Records artists
Singers from London